TV/EP is an EP by Less Than Jake. Apart from re-masters of their earlier albums, this EP is the second Less Than Jake release to be distributed by their own label Sleep It Off Records, following 2008's full-length album GNV FLA. The recording consists of covers of TV theme songs and product jingles.

The album was released as a CD and digital download on October 12, 2010. A few weeks prior to the release date, a video of the band's version of the Animaniacs theme song was released on their official website as a teaser to EP. Each song is tracklisted on the album, not by the title of the actual song being covered, but by a succession of tracks titled "Channel 1", "Channel 2", etc. "Channel 4" contains a reference to the song "Weinershnitzel" by the Descendents.

Reception
The TV/EP received generally mixed to positive reviews from critics, many of which note the EP's positive feeling but its limited appeal. James Greene Jr. of Crawdaddy.com said that "[the] TV/EP will surely appease the band’s legions of rabid fans and anyone who likes a good 15-minute chunk of novelty music."  TheyWillRockYou.com gave the album 4-out-of-5 stars and concluded that it is a "fun throwaway album from a great band" but that its "lasting value... is debatable." Likewise, Allmusic.com called the record "fast and fun," with a "cool idea" but ultimately "too disjointed to be anything more than a one-listen novelty."

Track listing

References

External links
 2010 interview with Buddy about TV/EP

Less Than Jake albums
2010 EPs
Covers EPs